Mateševo is a village in northern Montenegro, within Kolašin Municipality. The 2003 census put the population at 97. 

The first phase of Bar-Boljare motorway was extended from Podgorica to this village.

References 

Populated places in Kolašin Municipality
Serb communities in Montenegro